The Korgis is the debut studio album by English pop band, the Korgis.
It was released in 1979 on Rialto Records in the UK, and on Warner Bros. Records in the US.

The album includes the singles "Young and Russian" and "If I Had You" (#13, UK Singles Chart), the latter being notable for the keyboard contributions of Alan Wilder, who in 1982 would join Depeche Mode for thirteen years.

The Korgis was re-issued on compact disc by Edsel Records in 1999.

Track listing
Side A:
"Young 'n' Russian"  (Davis, Jakki Ridlington, Warren) - 3:12 
"I Just Can't Help It" (Davis) - 3:43 
"Chinese Girl" (Davis) - 2:19 
"Art School Annexe" (Davis) - 3:37 
"Boots and Shoes" (Davis, Warren) - 4:32
Side B:
"Dirty Postcards"  (Warren) - 4:45 
"O Maxine" (Warren) - 2:39 
"Mount Everest Sings the Blues" (Warren) - 2:32 
"Cold Tea" (Warren) - 4:26 
"If I Had You" (Davis, Sergei Rachmaninoff) - 3:55
 Album version

Personnel
 James Warren - vocals, bass guitar
 Andy Davis - vocals, drums, keyboards, mandolin
 Stuart Gordon - violin, mandolin, percussion
 Phil Harrison - keyboards, percussion
 Bill Birks - drums, percussion

Additional personnel
 Alan Wilder - backing vocals, keyboards
 Glenn Tommey - keyboards
 David Lord - keyboards
 Al Powell - drums
 Kenny Lacey - percussion
 Keith Warmington - harmonica
 Jo Mullet - backing vocals
 Jo Pomeroy - backing vocals

Production

 The Korgis - producers
 David Lord - sound engineer
 Glenn Tommey - assistant engineer
 George Rowbottom - art direction
 Julian Balme - art direction
 Martyn Goddard - photography
 Heath Bros. - management
 Recorded at Crescent Studios, Bath, Somerset 1977 (track B5), 1978 (tracks A1-A4, B2 & B3) & 1979 (tracks A5, B1 & B4).

Release history
 1979 LP Rialto Records TENOR 101 (UK)
 1979 LP Warner Bros. Records 3349 (US)
 1999 CD Edsel Records EDCD 621

Single releases
 "Young 'n' Russian" / "Cold Tea" (Rialto TREB 101, March 1979)
 "If I Had You" (Single Version) / "Chinese Girl" (TREB 103, May 1979) UK #13
 "Young 'n' Russian" / "Mount Everest Sings the Blues" (re-issue, TREB 108, October 1979)
 "I Just Can't Help It (Remix)" / "O Maxine" (TREB 112, January 1980)

References

1979 debut albums
The Korgis albums
Warner Records albums